"Q&A" is the fifth episode of the second season of the American television drama series Homeland, and the 17th episode overall.  It originally aired on Showtime on October 28, 2012.

The original broadcast was watched by 2.07 million viewers which marked an all-time high for the series.  Along with Dexter, it was the first time two Showtime programs topped two million viewers in the same night.

The episode was cited by multiple publications as one of the best television episodes of 2012.

Plot 
Brody (Damian Lewis) is brought to an unknown location and is alone, handcuffed in a room with cameras watching him. Quinn (Rupert Friend) enters and begins the interrogation while Saul (Mandy Patinkin) and Carrie (Claire Danes) observe from another room. He starts with a line of questioning designed to get Brody to tell a series of lies. Brody denies knowing Abu Nazir's son, and claims he never wore a suicide vest and had no involvement in any plot with Tom Walker. Quinn then shows the video of Brody's confession that they acquired and leaves him alone for a while to think about it. When Quinn returns, Brody readily confesses to knowing and loving Issa, and being angry at Vice President Walden, but denies ever wearing a suicide vest. Brody boasts that nothing happened in that bunker and they have no real evidence on him. When he cannot extract any more information, Quinn explodes in anger and stabs Brody in the hand with a knife. Quinn later explains his actions to Saul as a performance, because "every good cop needs a bad cop."

Carrie takes over the interrogation and begins by shutting off all of the cameras in the room, though Saul and Quinn can still hear the audio. She removes Brody's handcuffs and gets him some water. Carrie then sits down and recaps how Brody wrecked her career and her life, and asks whether he felt any guilt doing it, and whether he had any feelings for her, to which Brody does not answer. She traps Brody in a lie about the confession video, and asks Brody when the last time he told the truth about something was. Carrie says it can be fun to tell the truth, and disarms Brody by blurting out that she wishes he would leave his family and move in with her. She describes how Abu Nazir systematically broke Brody down and rebuilt him, and recounts in detail some of Abu Nazir's past terrorist attacks which resulted in mass civilian casualties, referring to the civilians as "Chrises, Danas, and Jessicas." Carrie correctly surmises that it was a phone call from Dana that kept Brody from exploding the vest. She stresses that behind all of Brody's lies, there is a good man, and that is the Brody she fell in love with. Carrie characterizes Abu Nazir and Walden as "monsters" who will kill innocent people, but that Brody is not such a monster, because he was put in a position to do so but did not explode the vest.

Carrie asks Brody what Abu Nazir's plot is. Brody finally breaks, confessing that Abu Nazir is planning an attack on the U.S., though he does not know the nature of it. He gives up the names of Roya Hammad, his handler, and Bassel, the tailor who crafted the suicide vest. As Brody recounts the various al-Qaeda associates he has had contact with, he realizes all of them are now dead. Later on, Carrie tells Brody his options. He can be exposed publicly, go to trial, and face prison time, or he can use his position to help the CIA anticipate Abu Nazir's planned attack, and nobody will have to know the truth about him.
  
Finn (Timothée Chalamet) takes Dana (Morgan Saylor) out on a date. Finn speeds away from a red light in an attempt to lose the Secret Service protection following him. The teens laugh as they speed through the streets weaving through traffic. Pulling out of an alley, Finn accidentally hits a pedestrian, seriously injuring her. Finn wants to flee the scene, dreading the consequences if anyone found out what he did, while Dana frantically protests. They drive away when they see another bystander helping the injured pedestrian.

Brody returns home. Jessica (Morena Baccarin) again demands the truth about what Brody's been doing if he is to be welcomed back into their home. Brody tells her that he is working with the CIA "helping out on matters of national security."

Production 
The episode was written by executive producer Henry Bromell, and was directed by Lesli Linka Glatter.

Reception

Ratings
The original American broadcast received 2.07 million viewers, which increased in viewership and became the highest rated episode up to that point.

Critical reception
The centerpiece of the episode was Carrie's interrogation scene with Brody, which was highly acclaimed by critics.   The A.V. Club's Emily VanDerWerff called the interrogation "a masterpiece of both acting and writing" while giving the overall episode an "A" grade.  Andy Greenwald of Grantland.com said the scene was "The best thing I've seen on TV so far this year," crediting the acting as well as Bromell's writing and Glatter's camerawork.  HitFix's Alan Sepinwall hailed it as a "masterfully-constructed sequence" with "two incredible performances by Lewis and Danes." Sean T. Collins of Rolling Stone said "Q&A" was "one of the show's most intense and exhilarating episodes – arguably the episode the whole series has been building toward," but felt the episode was then brought down by Finn and Dana's accident, criticizing it as being too much of a soap opera-style twist. TIMEs James Poniewozik called the episode "an audacious and exhausting hour of television," and was most impressed by the "remarkable physical performances" by Claire Danes and Damian Lewis.

Accolades
"Q&A" was nominated for several awards. At the 65th Primetime Emmy Awards, Henry Bromell received a posthumous nomination and win for his teleplay, in the Outstanding Writing in a Drama Series category. Lesli Linka Glatter was nominated for Outstanding Directing for a Drama Series. Claire Danes and Damian Lewis both submitted the episode for consideration on their behalf, in the Outstanding Lead Actress in a Drama Series and Outstanding Lead Actor in a Drama Series categories respectively. Danes won in her category, but Lewis did not. Rupert Friend was nominated for Outstanding Guest Actor in a Drama Series for his performance in the episode. At the 65th Directors Guild of America Awards, Glatter was nominated for Outstanding Directing - Dramatic Series.

At year's end, several publications cited "Q&A" as one of the best television episodes in all of 2012, including TIME, TV Guide, GQ, and IndieWire.

References

External links 
 "Q&A" at Showtime
 

2012 American television episodes
Homeland (season 2) episodes
Emmy Award-winning episodes
Television episodes directed by Lesli Linka Glatter